Michele Pinto (born 2 January 1931, Teggiano) is an Italian politician.

Biography
He served as Minister of agriculture in the Prodi I Cabinet and was the promoter of the "Pinto law" on fair reparation for the damage, patrimonial or non-patrimonial, suffered for the unreasonable duration of a trial (Law No. 89 of 24 March 2001).

On 4 February 1997 the Chamber of Deputies rejected with 250 votes in favor and 311 votes against a motion of no confidence filed by the Northern League and National Alliance against him on the charge of not having been able to protect Italian breeders before the European Union on the issue of milk quotas.

He was made Knight Grand Cross of the Order of Merit of the Italian Republic by the President in Rome on 21 December 2005.

External links
Michele Pinto - From the Senate of the Republic site - information on Pinto's parliamentary activity

References

1931 births
Living people
People from Teggiano
Agriculture ministers of Italy